Sovereign credit is the credit of a sovereign country backed by the financial resources of that state.  Sovereign credit is the opposite of sovereign debt.  Fiat money is sovereign credit and sovereign bonds are sovereign debts.  When money buys bonds, sovereign credit cancels sovereign debt.

See also
 Sovereignty
 Debt
 Government debt

External links
Liberating Sovereign Credit for Domestic Development

Public finance
Monetary reform